WKFN (540 AM, "ESPN Clarksville") is a radio station broadcasting a sports format. It is an affiliate of ESPN Radio.  The station is licensed to Clarksville, Tennessee.  The station is currently owned by the Five Star Media Group subsidiary of Saga Communications, who also operates WVVR 100.3 Country, WRND 94.3 Classic Hits, WCVQ 107.9 Adult Contemporary, and WZZP 97.5  FM Active Rock from its main offices in Clarksville.

History 
WKFN had its beginnings as WDXN AM which stood for  Dixie Network, the original owner.  The Dixie Network was based in Jackson, Tennessee where it operated WDXI/1310 and WDXI-TV/7.   They also owned WENK, Union City, Tennessee and WTPR AM/-FM, Paris, Tennessee.  WTPR-FM is now WAKQ.   Dixie also owned WDXE, Lawrenceburg, Tennessee and another AM station in Corinth, Mississippi.

The network was operated by Aaron B. Robinson.  Upon his death in 1961, the stations were held in trust by a bank in Jackson which was to decide if Aaron Robinson, Jr. should inherit them.  The bank eventually deemed that he should not and the stations all were sold, and the operations of the network wound up, in 1973.

The Dixie Radio Network had six stations, three of which had call letters which contained the letters WDX: WDXE Lawrenceburg and WDXI Jackson were sister stations to WDXN. All these stations were primarily "daytimers" until 1986 when deregulation allowed broadcasting past sundown and then began broadcasting 24 hours a day.

At one time WDXN was owned by Jack Mayer of Clarksville, who was the long-time secretary of the Tennessee Association of Broadcasters.

On February 1, 2001, the station was acquired by Saga Communications of Tuckessee, Inc., who in the same year, changed the call letters to the current WKFN.

References

External links

ESPN Radio stations
KFN
Radio stations established in 1986
1986 establishments in Tennessee
Clarksville, Tennessee